Eric Alfred Meads (17 August 1916 – 23 June 2006) was an English cricketer active from 1939 to 1954 who played for Nottinghamshire. He was born and died in Nottingham. He appeared in 205 first-class matches as a righthanded batsman and wicketkeeper. He scored 1,475 runs with a highest score of 56 not out and claimed 446 victims including 80 stumpings.

Notes

1916 births
2006 deaths
English cricketers
Nottinghamshire cricketers
Wicket-keepers